Crown glass was an early type of window glass. In this process, glass was blown into a "crown" or hollow globe. This was then transferred from the blowpipe to a punty and then flattened by reheating and spinning out the bowl-shaped piece of glass (bullion) into a flat disk by centrifugal force, up to 5 or 6 feet (1.5 to 1.8 metres) in diameter. The glass was then cut to the size required.

The thinnest glass was in a band at the edge of the disk, with the glass becoming thicker and more opaque toward the center. Known as a bullseye, the thicker center area around the pontil mark was used for less expensive windows. To fill large window spaces with the best glass, many small diamond shapes were cut from the edge of the disk, and then some might be halved into triangles. These were mounted in a lead lattice work and fitted into the window frame. 

Crown glass was one of the two most common processes for making window glass until the 19th century. The other was blown plate. Crown glass window panes with ceramic frames have been found at Soba East, the medieval capital of Alodia. They are only  in diameter and were probably used to provide light in storerooms. The process of making crown glass window panes was perfected by French glassmakers in the 1320s, notably around Rouen, and was a trade secret. Hence crown glass was not made in London until 1678.

Crown glass is one of many types of hand-blown glass. Other methods include: broad sheet, blown plate, polished plate and cylinder blown sheet. These methods of manufacture lasted at least until the end of the 19th century. The early 20th century marks the move away from hand-blown to machine-manufactured glass such as rolled plate, machine drawn cylinder sheet, flat drawn sheet, single and twin ground polished plate and float glass.

References

External links 

Glass production
Glass types
History of glass